
Gmina Łuków is a rural gmina (administrative district) in Łuków County, Lublin Voivodeship, in eastern Poland. Its seat is the town of Łuków, although the town is not part of the territory of the gmina.

Villages
Gmina Łuków contains the villages and settlements of Aleksandrów, Biardy, Czerśl, Dąbie, Dminin, Gołąbki, Gołaszyn, Gręzówka, Gręzówka-Kolonia, Jadwisin, Jeziory, Karwacz, Klimki, Kownatki, Krynka, Ławki, Łazy, Malcanów, Nowa Gręzówka, Podgaj, Role, Ryżki, Rzymy-Las, Rzymy-Rzymki, Sięciaszka Druga, Sięciaszka Pierwsza, Sięciaszka Trzecia, Strzyżew, Suchocin, Suleje, Świdry, Szczygły Dolne, Szczygły Górne, Turze Rogi, Wagram, Wólka Świątkowa, Zalesie, Zarzecz Łukowski and Żdżary.

Neighbouring gminas
Gmina Łuków is bordered by the town of Łuków and by the gminas of Domanice, Kąkolewnica Wschodnia, Stanin, Stoczek Łukowski, Trzebieszów, Ulan-Majorat, Wiśniew, Wojcieszków and Zbuczyn.

References
Polish official population figures 2006

Lukow
Łuków County